Inferential may refer to:

 Inferential statistics; see statistical inference
 Inference (logic)
 Inferential mood (grammar)
 Inferential programming
 Inferential role semantics
 Inferential theory of learning
 Informal inferential reasoning
 Simple non-inferential passage